Jarčje Brdo (in older sources also Jarče Brdo) is a dispersed settlement in the hills between the Selca Sora and the Poljane Sora valleys in the Municipality of Gorenja Vas–Poljane in the Upper Carniola region of Slovenia.

Name
Jarčje Brdo was attested in historical sources as Jartschemwerdi in 1500. The dialect adjective jarčji means 'sheep', and so the name Jarčje Brdo literally means 'sheep hill'.

Church

The local church is dedicated to Saint Valentine. It was built between 1854 and 1857 on the site of an earlier church and has a triple nave. The belfry from the earlier church, dating to 1728, is preserved.

References

External links 

Jarčje Brdo on Geopedia

Populated places in the Municipality of Gorenja vas-Poljane